Gregory Rex Todd (born 17 June 1982) is a former New Zealand cricketer who played first-class, List A and T20 cricket for Central Districts, Otago and Auckland from 2000 to 2012. 

Todd was born in Masterton. He played for New Zealand in the 2000 U-19 Cricket World Cup in Sri Lanka. He was the 2007 professional for Oldham Cricket Club. In the 2008 season he was professional for Guisborough Cricket Club in the North Yorkshire South Durham premier league.

See also
 List of Otago representative cricketers
 List of Auckland representative cricketers

References

External links
 

1982 births
Living people
New Zealand cricketers
Auckland cricketers
Central Districts cricketers
Otago cricketers
Cricketers from Masterton